Sendakkottai is a village in the Pattukkottai taluk of Thanjavur district, Tamil Nadu, India.

Demographics 

As per the 2001 census, Sendakkottai had a total population of 2116 with 1014 males and 1102 females. The sex ratio was 1087. The literacy rate was 74.89.

Economy 

Rice, banana, gingelly, sugarcane, groundnuts and coconuts are exported to other states in India. People surrounding Sendakkottai also cultivate crops such as cocoa, corn, sunflower. Some farmers who feel to lazy to work in their fields convert cultivation into coconut plantations, and because of this activity there is a hike in the price of rice and edible crops. This region always has had sugarcane cultivation as it yields more profit and the area has abundant underground water. The village yields a large volume of cow and buffalo milk that is distributed to other villages. However, most of the people in this area buy packaged milk due to lack of pastoral land and people have given up grazing cows. At the start of the summer when all the lakes dry up there are sales of fresh fishes and crabs. During the summer temperature rises up to 45 degrees Celsius, and to bear it, most of the houses are ceiled with woven coconut leaf. The elderly are involved in weaving this coconut.

References 

 

Villages in Thanjavur district